Sutherland Road station is a light rail stop on the MBTA Green Line B branch, located in the median of Commonwealth Avenue at its intersection with Sutherland Road, in Brighton, Boston, Massachusetts.  The stop consists of two side platforms, which serve the B branch's two tracks.  The platforms are at track level and the stop is not accessible. Track work in 2018–19, which included replacement of platform edges at several stops, triggered requirements for accessibility modifications at those stops. By December 2022, design for Sunderland Road and four other B Branch stops was 30% complete, with construction expected to last from fall 2023 to mid-2024.

References

External links

MBTA - Sutherland Road
 Station from Google Maps Street View

Brighton, Boston
Green Line (MBTA) stations
Railway stations in Boston